Motion is the debut album by the Cinematic Orchestra, released on 27 September 1999 on Ninja Tune.  The album's concept came from core band member, Jason Swinscoe, who had amassed various samples - drum patterns, basslines and melody samples - that had inspired and influenced him.  He then presented them to a group of musicians to learn and then improvise around.  The resulting draft tracks were then re-mixed on computer by Swinscoe to create the finished album.

In 2012, it was awarded a double silver certification from the Independent Music Companies Association which indicated sales of at least 40,000 copies throughout Europe.

Critical reaction 

Stanton Swihart, writing for AllMusic, stated: 

Additionally, the album's success led to the band being asked to perform at the 1999 Director's Guild Awards ceremony for the presentation of the Lifetime Achievement Award to film director Stanley Kubrick.

Track listing 
All tracks written and produced by Jason Swinscoe, except where noted.

Personnel
 Jason Swinscoe - producer
 Tom Chant - soprano sax, alto sax, acoustic piano, electric piano
 Jamie Coleman - flugelhorn, trumpet
 Phil France - acoustic bass, electric bass
 T. Daniel Howard - drums
 Eva Katzenmaier - producer
 Alex James – acoustic piano, electric piano (Now music teacher at Rochester Independent College)
 Saidi Kanba - percussions

References

External links 
 
 

1999 debut albums
The Cinematic Orchestra albums
Ninja Tune albums